Suffolk County Transit operates a number of bus routes in Suffolk County, New York, United States; a few in the town of Huntington are operated by Huntington Area Rapid Transit. The Villages of Patchogue and Port Jefferson, also have had their own local jitney bus routes, although budget cuts have forced Port Jefferson to take its buses out of service.  Some of them are descendants of streetcar lines (see List of streetcar lines on Long Island). 
Sunday service is operated on S1, S33, S40, S41, S45, S54, S58, S61, S66, S92, 3D and 10C routes.
There is no service on New Year's Day, Memorial Day, Independence Day (July 4); Labor Day, Thanksgiving and Christmas Days.
Exceptions: S92 and 10C WILL run on Memorial Day, Independence Day (July 4) and Labor Day.
Some routes are operated with Saturday schedules on Martin Luther King Day, Presidents Day
and Veterans Day.

This table gives details for the routes that service Suffolk County primarily. For details on routes that run into Suffolk County but do not service it primarily, see:

List of bus routes in Nassau County, New York: n70, n72, n79

Suffolk County Transit (SCT)

S1 to S92

Former routes

Routes 1A to 10C

Former routes

Suffolk Clipper
Suffollk County Transit operates a weekday rush hour peak-direction express route known as the Suffolk Clipper (formerly known as the S110) between Long Island Expressway exit 63 (in
Farmingville) and exit 58 (in Islandia) Park-and-Ride lots to the Hauppauge Industrial Park 
(one round trip) and the NYS Route 110 Office/Industrial Corridor by way of the L.I.E. (I-495).
Regular SCT fares apply on this route.

Three trips operate west in the AM peak: 
Leave Farmingville 6:30, Islandia 6:42 > Route 110 Corridor 7:05 to 7:30 AM ;
Leave Farmingville 7:20 >  Route 110 Corridor 8:00 to 8:20 AM ;
Leave Farmingville 7:40 >  Hauppauge Industrial Park AND Route 110 Corridor 8:05 to 8:50 AM.

Four trips operate east in the PM peak:
Leave Route 110 Corridor 4:20 to 4:37 > 5:10 Islandia, 5:30 PM Farmingville ;
Leave Route 110 Corridor 4:30 to 5:02 > 5:25 Islandia, 5:45 PM Farmingville ;
Leave Hauppauge Industrial Park 5:15 to 5:25 > Farmingville 5:50 PM ;
Leave Route 110 Corridor 5:20 to 5:37 > 5:50 Islandia, 6:10 PM Farmingville.

Source: SCT Suffolk Clipper Schedule effective January 1, 2021

Huntington Area Rapid Transit (HART) 

Huntington Area Rapid Transit exclusively serves the Town of Huntington.

Former routes

Patchogue Bus 
These routes run local within the Village of Patchogue on weekdays only.

References

External links 
 Suffolk Transit
 Suffolk Transit bus schedules
 Suffolk Transit System Map
 Nassau/Suffolk Transit Map (unofficial)

Bus routes
Suffolk County
Bus transportation in New York (state)